A Stoning in Fulham County is a 1988 television film directed by Larry Elikann.  It takes place in fictional Fulham County, North Carolina.
It is based on the true story of the murder of an Amish baby by a group of reckless teens in Indiana in 1979.

Plot
An Amish family is returning home from a gathering when a group of reckless local teens drives past them in a red pickup truck shouting insults and throwing rocks.  A rock hits the seven-month-old baby of the family, causing family patriarch Jacob (Ron Perlman) to borrow a nearby neighbor's phone to call for an ambulance.  The baby dies, and county prosecutor Jim Sandler (Ken Olin) decides to investigate and prosecute for reckless homicide.

To his frustration, he finds that the Amish family takes Biblical commandments to "turn the other cheek" and that "vengeance belongs to the Lord" literally and as forbidding to help civil authorities punish those who hurt them. Therefore, the prosecutor must work to persuade them to speak up about what happened so that future harassment and aggression against the Amish community will cease.

Cast
 Ron Perlman as Jacob Shuler
 Ken Olin as Jim Sandler
 Jill Eikenberry as Susan
 Gregg Henry as Sheriff Woodman
 Nicholas Pryor as Baxter
 Brad Pitt as Teddy Johnson
 Michael Criscuolo as Philip Carr

References

External links
 

1988 films
1988 television films
Amish in films
Amish in popular culture
Films about lawyers
Films scored by Don Davis (composer)
Films about Christianity
Films set in North Carolina
NBC network original films
Films directed by Larry Elikann